The Chikuhō coalfield is located on Kyushu Island, Japan.

Location of the Coalfield and its Collieries

References

Coal mining regions